Crown Point Central School is a school in Essex County, New York that serves grades Pre-K to Grade 12. The Superintendent is Ms. Shari Brannock, and the Principal is Ms. Tara Celotti.

Administration

School Officials 
Ms. Shari Brannock–Superintendent
Ms. Tara Celotti–Principal
Ms. Margot Anello–School Psychologist
Ms. Jill Spring–District Tax Collector
Ms.  Victoria Tuthill-Russell–District Treasurer

Board of Education 
Mr. Mitch St Pierre–President
Ms. Jacalyn Popp–Vice President
Ms. Julie Budwick
Ms. Kimberly Woods
Mr. Kevin Gadway
Mr. Kenneth LaDeau
Ms. Sharon Reynolds

History

Selected former superintendents 
Previous assignment and reason for departure noted in parentheses
Mr. A. Jack Roberts
Mr. Boyd McKendrick–?-2003
Mr. James M. Bier–2003-2004

Selected former principals 
Mr. Michael Stuart

References

External links 
Official Website

School districts in New York (state)
Schools in Essex County, New York
Public high schools in New York (state)
Public middle schools in New York (state)
Public elementary schools in New York (state)